Johannes Klesment (also Johannes Kleesment; 30 May 1896 Keila Parish (now Keila), Kreis Harrien – 23 December 1967 Washington, D.C.) was an Estonian politician. He was a member of the third and fourth legislatures of the Estonian Parliament, representing the Estonian Socialist Workers' Party. Klesment served as minister of justice in the Estonian government-in-exile from 1945 to 1953. In the 1950s, Klesment also served as the editor of The Baltic Review, a journal published in New York by the Committees for a Free Estonia, Latvia, and Lithuania from 1953 to 1971.

References

1896 births
1967 deaths
People from Keila
People from Kreis Harrien
Estonian Socialist Workers' Party politicians
Members of the Riigikogu, 1926–1929
Members of the Riigikogu, 1929–1932
20th-century Estonian lawyers
University of Tartu alumni
Recipients of the Cross of Liberty (Estonia)
Estonian World War II refugees
Estonian emigrants to the United States